Alexander Frederik Møsting (1680-1737) was a Dano-Norwegian royal court official. He served as the Diocesan Governor of Christianssand stiftamt from 1728 to 1730. After leaving this position, he was appointed to the position of Hofmeister for King Christian VI's sister, Princess Charlotte Amalie of Denmark.

References

1680 births
1737 deaths
County governors of Norway